is a Japanese television jidaigeki or period drama that was broadcast in 1982 to 1983. It is the 19th in the Hissatsu series. The drama is a sequel to Shin Hissatsu Shigotonin.

Plot

Cast
Makoto Fujita as Mondo Nakamura
Kunihiko Mitamura as Kazarishokunin no Hide
Kiyoshi Nakajō as Shamisenya no Yuji
Izumi Ayukawa as Nandemoya no Kayo
Ippei Hikaru as Junnosuke Nishi
Isuzu Yamada as Oriku
Kin Sugai as Sen Nakamura
Mari Shiraki as Ritsu Nakamura
Toshio Yamauchi as Chief Constable (Hittōdōshin) Kumagorō Tanaka

References

1982 Japanese television series debuts
1980s drama television series
Jidaigeki television series